The president of Zimbabwe Rhodesia was the head of state of Zimbabwe Rhodesia. Like the country itself, it was never internationally recognized.

The only president of Zimbabwe Rhodesia was Josiah Zion Gumede.

History of the office
The position was established on 1 June 1979, under the terms of the Internal Settlement negotiated between the government of Rhodesia and moderate African nationalists. It existed until, under the terms of the Lancaster House Agreement, control was turned over to Lord Soames as Governor of Southern Rhodesia on 12 December 1979.

President of Zimbabwe Rhodesia (1979)
Parties

See also
Prime Minister of Zimbabwe Rhodesia
Government of Zimbabwe Rhodesia
President of Rhodesia
President of Zimbabwe

References

Politics of Rhodesia
Zimbabwe Rhodesia
Titles held only by one person